Nee Illadhe (English: 'Without You') is a 2011 Kannada film in the romance genre starring Raghu Mukherjee and Pooja Gandhi in the lead roles . The film has been directed, co-produced and written by Shiva Ganapathy, Cinematography and project designed by T. Surendra Reddy and produced by Channapati Nagamalleshwari under Ekarudradevi banner. The duo Ashley Mendonca and Abhilash Lakra have composed the music. The film released on 25 March 2011.

Plot
Pooja Gandhi plays the role of a village girl who comes to city to learn music. Raghu Mukherjee plays the music teacher role. The story revolves around the lives of the teacher and student.

Cast
 Raghu Mukherjee
 Pooja Gandhi
 Bullet Prakash
 Anantha Velu
 Jayalakshmi

Controversy
Pooja Gandhi came under a huge controversial news related to the settlement of her dues for this film with the producers. The controversy reached to a great height when Pooja was banned for 6 months from acting by the Karnataka Film Association.

Soundtrack

Reception

Critical response 

A critic from The Times of India scored the film at 2 out of 5 stars and says "Rest of the movie drags on without any logic, and as expected, has an abrupt end. Except for Pooja Gandhi, and to some extent Raghu Mukherjee, who try their best to lift the movie with their performances, others fail to impress. The movie is an exercise in futile". Shruti Indira Lakshminarayana from Rediff.com scored the film at 1 out of 5 stars and says "The film's music is nothing to boast of either. In fact, an item song picturised in the middle of a mine couldn't have gotten worse. Dialogues are old fashioned and the climax is nothing great either. All in all, Nee Illade has nothing going for it. Here's hoping Pooja and Raghu make better script choices in the future". A critic from The New Indian Express wrote "It would be difficult for the audience to cope with this awkward narration. There is nothing to revel about the music and songs are not up to the mark. All in all, it is not clear what made director Sivaganapathi to come out with this movie that helps neither him nor the artistes and even the audience, who not only pay money to buy the ticket".

References

2011 films
2010s Kannada-language films